The Buckingham may refer to:

The Buckingham (Chicago, Illinois), a condominium building
The Buckingham (Indianapolis, Indiana), listed on the U.S. National Register of Historic Places

See also
Buckingham House (disambiguation)